Spin the Wheel is the second album by Irish girl group, Bellefire. It was released in Asia around July 2004 and the singles garnered high radio airplay and chart positioning. This led to the band touring South East Asian countries including the Philippines, Malaysia, Thailand and Hong Kong. Although the band enjoyed some success in Europe with their singles, they parted ways with their record label EastWest before the album was scheduled for release there.

The album  features many covers of famous songs like "You Were Meant for Me", the hit originally performed by Jewel, and "Need to Be Next to You", penned by Diane Warren and sung by Leigh Nash, lead vocalist of Sixpence None the Richer, for the film Bounce. Also included is a cover of Mark Wills' "What Hurts the Most", which was later covered by Jo O'Meara and Rascal Flatts.

Track listing
"Say Something Anyway
"You Were Meant for Me" 
"Spin the Wheel"
"What Hurts the Most"
"Nobody Loves Me Like You Do"
"Damn"
"Pieces of You"
"Sold Out"
"Can't Cry Hard Enough"
"Need to Be Next to You"
"Stay"
"I'll Never Get Over You (Getting Over Me)"
"Don't Know Why"

Bonus tracks and video CD

UK edition 
14. "Nothing at All"

Japanese edition
14. "Not Letting Go"
15. "To Be with You"

Thailand special edition
14. "Not Letting Go"
15. "To Be with You"
16. "Spin the Wheel (Groovefinder Edit)"
17. "Say Something Anyway (Bimbo Jones Remix)"

Bonus VCD
"Say Something Anyway" (Video)
"Spin the Wheel" (Video)
"You Were Meant for Me" (Video)
E.P.K. (Documentary Video)
Photo Gallery

References

Bellefire albums
2004 albums
East West Records albums